"Tit for Tat (Ain't No Taking Back)" is a Christmas song recorded by James Brown. Released as a single in 1968, it charted #86 Pop.

References

James Brown songs
Songs written by James Brown
American Christmas songs
1968 singles
1968 songs
King Records (United States) singles